The Carlos Palanca Memorial Awards for Literature winners in the year 1987 (rank, title of winning entry, name of author).


English division
Novel
Grand prize: “Great Philippine Jungle Energy Café” by Alfred A. Yuson

Short story
First prize: “The Flood in Tarlac” by Gregorio Brillantes
Second prize: “The Body” by Jose Y. Dalisay Jr.
Third prize: “Another Country” by Charlson Ong; and “The Bird Lover of City Hall” by Eli Ang Barroso

Poetry
First prize: “(Instead of a Will These) For All the Loved Ones” by Lina Sagaral Reyes; and “Peopleness” by Merlinda Bobis
Second prize: “Enemigo Mortal” by Constantino Tejero; and “Hinterland” by Edgardo B. Maranan
Third prize: “The Quality of Light (Home Colors, Foreign Hues)” by Ma. Fatima V. Lim; and “Word Without End” by Cesar Ruiz Aquino

Essay
First prize: “The Legacy of the Old-Chinese Merchants of Manila” by Wilson Lee Flores
Second prize: “Dislocation” by Danton R. Remoto
Third prize: “Don Jose Ma. Basa, the Untold Saga of an Illustrado Patriot” by Wilson Lee Flores; and “Gen. Macario Sakay and the Katagalugan Republic vs. the United States” by Wilson Lee Flores

One-act play
First prize: “Fiesta” by Bobby Flores Villasis
Second prize: “Wish Afternoon in A Slum” by Ametta Suarez Taguchi
Third prize: “In Transit” by Jose Y. Dalisay Jr.

Full-length play
First prize: “Busman's Holiday” by Jessie B. Garcia
Second prize: “Song of the Sparrow” by Elsa M. Coscolluela
Third prize: “Cachil Kudarat (Sultan of Mindanao) or Cachil Corrala” by Mig Alvarez Enriquez

Filipino division
Novel
Special mention “Mga Aninong Hubad” by Cyrus P. Borja; and “Mga Limbas sa Lupa ng Muhammad” ni Ramon V. Lim

Short story
First prize: “Isang Pook, Dalawang Panahon” by Evelyn E. Sebastian
Second prize: “Batang Plantasyon” by Cyrus P. Borja
Third prize: “Talinhaga ng Talahib ng Los Indios Bravos” by Fidel Rillo, Jr.

Poetry
First prize: “Mga Liham ni Pinay at Iba Pang Tula” by Ruth Elynia S. Mabanglo
Second prize: “Namulandayan” by Edgardo B. Maranan
Third prize: “Bangungot ng Lungsod at Iba pang Tula” by Aida Santos Maranan

Essay
First prize: “Lakas ng Libro/Lakas ng Tao: Pagdidiskonstrak sa Teksto ng Pebrero” by Isagani R. Cruz
Second prize: “Bulkan, Bundok, Baha” by Edgardo B. Maranan
Third prize: “Malay” by Emmanuel Mario B Santos aka Marc Guerrero

One-act play
First prize: “Kinang sa Uling” by Ronaldo C. Tumbokon; and “Mutya ng Saging” by Leoncio P. Deriada
Second prize: “Agunya” by Aileen M. Aromin; and “Asawa” by Rolando Dela Cruz and Rene O. Villanueva
Third prize: “Pal” by Ronaldo L. Carcamo

Full-length play
First prize: “Marissa” by Isagani R. Cruz
Second prize: “Awit ng Adarna” by Rene O. Villanueva
Third prize: “Salidumay: Awit sa Apoy” by Jose C. Papa

References
 

Palanca Awards
Palanca Awards, 1987